Calumet County is a county located in the U.S. state of Wisconsin. As of the 2020 census, the population was 52,442. The county seat is Chilton. The county was created in 1836 (then in the Wisconsin Territory) and organized in 1850.

Calumet County is included in the Appleton, WI Metropolitan Statistical Area as well as the Appleton-Oshkosh-Neenah, WI Combined Statistical Area.

The Holyland is partially located in southern Calumet County.

History
The county's name originated from the word calumet, the French name for the  ceremonial pipes used by Native Americans in councils on the east shore of Lake Winnebago.

In the 1830s, the United States government relocated Native Americans from New York and New England to the southwest part of the county; these included the Brothertown Indians, Oneida Indians, and Stockbridge-Munsee Indians. This was a second migration for the Brothertown and Stockbridge Indians, who had moved to New York after the American Revolutionary War. The Oneida shared land on their reservation with these peoples, who had been displaced by the years of colonization in New England, warfare and disease. Each of the three groups are federally recognized with reservations in Wisconsin.

Many of the early European residents in the Holyland region in the southern part of the county were emigrants from the Schleswig-Holstein region in Germany in the 1840s.

The county was legally organized on February 5, 1850, by Chapter 84 Laws of 1850.

Calumet County figures prominently in the 2015 Netflix television series Making a Murderer, which documents the arrests and trials of Manitowoc County resident Steven Avery, which involves from 2005 the Calumet sheriff's department and district attorney's office of Ken Kratz.

Geography
It is the fifth-smallest county in Wisconsin by land area and fourth-smallest by total area. The west boundary is largely in Lake Winnebago. The Niagara Escarpment runs north–south several miles east of the western boundary. The topography has been greatly influenced by glaciation.

Adjacent counties
 Brown County – northeast
 Manitowoc County – east
 Sheboygan County – southeast
 Fond du Lac County – southwest
 Winnebago County – west
 Outagamie County – northwest

Climate

Demographics

2020 census
As of the census of 2020, the population was 52,442. The racial makeup of the county was 88.7% White, 2.4% Asian, 0.8% Black or African American, 0.5% Native American, 0.1% Pacific Islander, 2.9% from other races, and 4.6% from two or more races. Ethnically, the population was 5.4% Hispanic or Latino of any race.

2020 census

As of the census of 2000, there were 40,631 people, 14,910 households, and 11,167 families residing in the county. The racial makeup of the county was 96.68% White, 0.31% Black or African American, 0.34% Native American, 1.55% Asian, 0.01% Pacific Islander, 0.38% from other races, and 0.74% from two or more races.  1.07% of the population were Hispanic or Latino of any race. 63.4% were of German ancestry. 96.0% spoke English, 1.7% Spanish and 1.2% German as their first language.

There were 14,910 households, out of which 38.50% had children under the age of 18 living with them, 65.00% were married couples living together, 6.50% had a female householder with no husband present, and 25.10% were non-families. 20.40% of all households were made up of individuals, and 7.50% had someone living alone who was 65 years of age or older. The average household size was 2.70 and the average family size was 3.15.

In the county, the population was spread out, with 28.60% under the age of 18, 7.20% from 18 to 24, 32.00% from 25 to 44, 21.40% from 45 to 64, and 10.80% who were 65 years of age or older. The median age was 35 years. For every 100 females there were 100.00 males. For every 100 females age 18 and over, there were 99.00 males.

In 2017, there were 478 births, giving a general fertility rate of 52.0 births per 1000 women aged 15–44, the ninth lowest rate out of all 72 Wisconsin counties. Additionally, there were 14 reported induced abortions performed on women of Calumet County residence in 2017.

Economy
The University of Wisconsin–Extension has compiled statistics on Calumet County's dairy industry. Calumet County has more bovines (cattle and calves) than people. As of 2010 there are 28,600 head of dairy cows and 65,000 head of bovine total (that includes dairy cows, beef cattle, and calves.) 73% of land in the county is owned by farmers. 2400 residents are employed in farming. Agriculture results in $338 million in economic activity, and it contributes $68.2 million in income to the county total income (including $7.2 million towards taxes). As of 2007, 99.3% of farms are owned by individuals, families, family partnerships or family corporations. Only 0.7% are owned by non-family corporate entities. As of April 1, 2010, Calumet county had 174 farms with dairy herd licenses.

In 1931, the Wisconsin Department of Agriculture described Calumet County as "one of the most important producers of American cheese among the counties of Wisconsin."

Transportation

Major highways

  U.S. Highway 10
  U.S. Highway 151
  Highway 32 (Wisconsin)
  Highway 55 (Wisconsin)
  Highway 57 (Wisconsin)
  Highway 114 (Wisconsin)
  Highway 441 (Wisconsin)

No interstate highways run through Calumet County. There are several U.S. routes in the county. U.S. Route 10 runs east–west across the north edge of the county. U.S. Route 151 runs north–south near the west edge of the county, and turns east–west at the middle of the county. North-south state highways include 55 along the west edge, and 32/57 through the center. East-west state highways include 114 at the northwest corner of the county, and the now defunct 149 along the southeast corner. The Tri-County Expressway (WI 441) runs in an east–west to north–south curve in the extreme northwest corner of the county within Appleton city limits.

Railroads
Wisconsin and Southern Railroad
Canadian National

Buses
Valley Transit (Wisconsin)
List of intercity bus stops in Wisconsin

Airport
New Holstein Municipal Airport (8D1) serves the county and surrounding communities. It is located just west of New Holstein.

Water
Nearly the entire west boundary of the county is located in Lake Winnebago. The first non-natives to enter the county most likely came in the county from the lake through the Fox River. The Manitowoc River and Sheboygan River both run through the county and flow into Lake Michigan through neighboring counties.

Recreation

County Parks

Calumet County has three county parks, and two county run harbors.

Calumet County Fairgrounds
Calumet County celebrated its 150th annual fair in 2006. The fairgrounds held dirt track stockcars races on Friday nights in the summer.

Lake Winnebago

The west boundary of the county is located almost entirely in Lake Winnebago. Boaters use the lake for recreational boating and fishing in the summer. The lake is the site of ice fishing in the winter, and the Wisconsin Department of Natural Resources manages a sturgeon spearing season in February.

Communities

Cities
 Appleton (mostly in Outagamie County and Winnebago County)
 Brillion
 Chilton (county seat)
 Kaukauna, Wisconsin (mostly in Outagamie County, Wisconsin)
 Kiel (mostly in Manitowoc County)
 Menasha (mostly in Winnebago County)
 New Holstein

Villages
 Harrison (partial)
 Hilbert
 Potter
 Sherwood
 Stockbridge

Towns

 Brillion
 Brothertown
 Charlestown
 Chilton
 Harrison
 New Holstein
 Rantoul
 Stockbridge
 Woodville

Census-designated place
 Forest Junction

Unincorporated communities

 Brant
 Brothertown
 Calumetville (partial)
 Charlesburg
 Dundas
 Eckers Lakeland
 Hayton
 Highland Beach
 Jericho
 Kloten
 Maple Heights
 Meggers (partial)
 Quinney
 Rockaway Beach
 Saint Catherines Bay
 St. Anna (partial)
 St. John
 Utowana Beach
 Waverly Beach (partial)
 Wells (partial)

Ghost town/neighborhood
 Harrison
 Pequot

Politics

Notable people
 Ken Kratz (born 1960–61), lawyer, former district attorney of Calumet County; law license was suspended for four months after sexting scandal.

See also
 National Register of Historic Places listings in Calumet County, Wisconsin

References

External links
 Calumet County Government
 Calumet County map from the Wisconsin Department of Transportation
 Calumet County Fair

 
1850 establishments in Wisconsin
Populated places established in 1850